Raid 2 can refer to:
The Raid 2, a 2014 Indonesian film
RAID 2, a disk drive array configuration